"The Chips Are Down" is a French idiom used in cards, roughly meaning 'the plays are made'. It may also refer to:

 The Chips Are Down (screenplay), a screenplay by Jean-Paul Sartre
 Les jeux sont faits (film), the 1947 French drama of the same name, based on the screenplay
 "The Chips Are Down", an episode of the French animated television series Code Lyoko